Stoke Newington was an ancient parish in the county of Middlesex. It was both a civil parish, used for administrative purposes, and an ecclesiastical parish of the Church of England.

Civil parish

The vestry of the civil parish was entrusted with various administrative functions from the 17th century. In 1837 it became a part of the Poor Law Union of Hackney. In 1855 the parish was included in the area of the Metropolitan Board of Works. Together with Hackney, Stoke Newington formed the Hackney District of the Metropolis. In 1889 the district was included in the new County of London.

In 1891 as its population had increased the parish of St Mary Stoke Newington was divided into five wards (electing vestrymen): Lordship (15), Church (15), Manor (12), Clissold (9) and Palatine (9).

It was dissolved in 1894 with Hackney and Stoke Newington vestries forming separate local authorities. In 1900 the civil vestries were dissolved, and the Stoke Newington parish became the Metropolitan Borough of Stoke Newington. At the same time, Stoke Newington absorbed most of the parish and urban district of South Hornsey, which had been an exclave of Middlesex in the County of London. The civil parish and metropolitan borough were abolished in 1965 and used to form part of the London Borough of Hackney.

Ecclesiastical parish

The ancient parish, dedicated to St Mary,  was in the Diocese of London and was sometimes called Newington Canonicorum. Stoke Newington Church Street is one long road along which the village developed.

As the population increased the parish was divided:
 In 1849 a new parish of Stoke Newington, St Matthias was formed from part of the ancient parish and part of neighbouring Hornsey. St Matthias Church was completed in 1853 to the designs of William Butterfield, services previously being held in a local school. It was known as one of London’s foremost High Churches, as part of the impetus and money for its founding came from a rich doctor named Robert Brett, who thought that the Dissenting chapels such as Newington Green Unitarian Church were attracting so many worshippers in part because the Anglican pews were full.
 In 1873 two new parishes of Stoke Newington, All Saints and Stoke Newington, St Faith were carved out of the parishes of St Mary and St Matthias. All Saints church was in Aden Grove, replacing an earlier iron structure, in 1876. It was demolished in 1956. St Faith's church was built on Londesborough Road in 1873, badly damaged by bombing in 1944, and finally abandoned and demolished in 1949.
 In 1883 the parish of Stoke Newington, St Andrew was created from part of St Mary's parish and part of Stamford Hill. The church was built in 1884 on Bethune and Fairholt Roads.
 The final division of the parish was in 1892, when Stoke Newington, St Olave was formed from part of St Mary's, part of St Andrew's and also included parts of the parishes of Stamford Hill, Vartry Road and Hanger Lane. The church, in Woodberry Down, was completed in 1893 to the designs of Ewan Christian. The bells, font and pulpit from the City of London church of St Olave's, Jewry, demolished in 1891 were moved here.
 There was also the parish of Stoke Newington Common, created in 1886. This was outside the area of the ancient parish, being made from parts of Stamford Hill and West Hackney.

Many of the churches were severely damaged by bombs during World War II. Although both St Mary's and St Matthias were eventually restored, the extent of the damage, combined with a decrease in the population of the area, led to a number of these parishes being combined in the 20th century. For instance, in 1951 St Faith and St Matthias parishes were merged. in 1956 they were again merged with All Saints to form Stoke Newington, St Faith with St Matthias and All Saints In 1974 the name of the combined parish was shortened to Stoke Newington, St Matthias.

As of June 2006 the parishes are known by the following names:
St Mary, Stoke Newington
St Matthias, Stoke Newington
St Andrew, Bethune Road
St Olave, Woodberry Down

Manor
The manor of the parish was originally called Nentone, and later took the name Stoke Newington.  The manor is co-extensive with the parish, and was the property of the Prebend of Newington, which is one of the prebends of St. Paul's Cathedral, in the gift of the Bishop of London.  This right is thought to have existed back to the time of Edward the Confessor.

See also
St Andrew, Stoke Newington
St Matthias' Church, Stoke Newington

References
Notes

Bibliography

 Guide to the Local Administrative Units of England, Vol.1, Frederic Youngs, London, 1979
 The Buildings of England: London except the Cities of London and Westminster, Nikolaus Pevsner, Harmondsworth, 1952
 The Village that Changed the World: A History of Newington Green London N16 by Alex Allardyce. Newington Green Action Group: 2008.

External links
 Churches of Stoke Newington 
 St Mary Stoke Newington 
 Diocese of London, parishes in Hackney Deanery 

History of the London Borough of Hackney
Religion in the London Borough of Hackney
Parishes governed by vestries (Metropolis) 
Parishes united into districts (Metropolis)
Former civil parishes in London
Stoke Newington